Ministry of Testing, also referred to as the MoT, is a global software testing community that was founded by Rosie Sherry, who was longlisted for most influential woman in UK tech by Computer Weekly in 2017 and 2018, as well as listed in the Female Founders 101 list by BusinessCloud. MoT started out as a UK-based internet forum for software testers and quickly grew into an independent business that provides software testing conferences and Meetups around the world, and an online learning platform dedicated to the craft of software testing.

Members of the Ministry of Testing community consist of software testers and those working in software quality. The community created by Ministry of Testing aims to get its participants sharing innovative practises and ideas around software testing. Computer Scientists at the University of Maryland used Ministry of Testing (along with organisations) to recruit software testers for a study into identifying vulnerabilities in software.

TestBash

Ministry of Testing's first conference, named TestBash, was first held in Cambridge. Events have been described as having a strong community atmosphere and using innovative conference engagement methods, such as The UnExpo and 99-Second Talks.
TestBash software testing conferences are largely informal events, with talks addressing areas of innovation across of testing, quality and working in software development. There are now multiple TestBash conferences taking place in 7 cities annually around the world. In 2018 the first TestBash focusing specifically on technical testing and automation will be held, and named Test.bash();.

Online learning platform
The Dojo is a learning platform dedicated to software testing. MoT co-create all the learning materials and courses on their learning platform with active software testers in their community.

References 

Information technology organizations
Software testing